Philippa Dickinson is a former editor for Puffin Books, and chairman of Random House Children's Publishing. During her time at Puffin, she was the editor of The Warlock of Firetop Mountain, and also acted for a time as the desk editor of Warlock magazine.

Early life
Philippa Dickinson was born in March 1955. She was educated at the then grammar school (now a private school) Godolphin and Latymer School in Hammersmith in London.

Career

Puffin and Fighting Fantasy
In 1974 she joined Puffin Children's Books, working initially for the Puffin Club. She soon moved over to the books editorial department. Whilst there, at the turn of 1981/1982 she was asked to edit a book called The Warlock of Firetop Mountain. Having received the first completed manuscript, it was Philippa who "diplomatically highlighted various inconsistencies" to its two authors Ian Livingstone and Steve Jackson. She noted that the two halves of the book were inconsistent (a product of having been written separately by Steve and Ian) and that this included apparent differences in the rules. For example, the attributes for fighting ability, constitution and fitness, and luck were labeled by Steve "Skill", "Stamina" and "Luck", and by Ian, "Combat Factor", "Strength Factor" and "Luck Factor". Also there were differences in how these were determined. Also, she is noted as having made crucial observations on the text, such as pointing out that the way in which choices were presented was inconsistent, and noting that the use of the terms Werewolf and Wolfman was inconsistent. She also noted the use of a copyright protected song but most importantly she pushed for the writing style to be aligned. Apparently, it was obvious that there had been a change in writer half way through, and so at her prompting one of the writers was to rewrite the other's half (Steve volunteered). Without her input this first, and most important book in the Fighting Fantasy series would not have been the success it was.

For the first five issues of Warlock Magazine, she also acted as desk editor, until Games Workshop took over the magazine from Penguin Books.

She eventually became deputy head of publishing at Puffin Books and left in 1986.

Transworld to Random House
In 1986 she joined Transworld and became the editorial director of Corgi Children's list. In March 1998, the media giant Bertelsmann, who were the owners of Transworld, acquired Random House. This led to the children's lists of Transworld and Random House being merged. At that time, Philippa Dickinson, was publisher of Transworld Children's Books and chair of the Publishers Association Children's Book Group. Debbie Sandford, the Managing Director of Random House Children's Publishing resigned and Philippa was made chairman of Random House Children's Publishing.

The new role of chairman of Random House Children's Publishing meant she would not become involved with day-to-day business at Random House, but as chairman, she had responsibility for both Random House Children's Books and Transworld Children's Books. She made it clear at the time that the two companies would continue to operate separately.

In May 2006, Philippa Dickinson was asked to be the vice-chairman of World Book Day. She said: "I’m delighted and flattered to be asked to take on this very important role. World Book Day provides a brilliant opportunity to attract a wide audience to books and reading. It’s been growing in scope and effectiveness every year. With the launch of Quick Reads this year taking WBD to a new level, and with Philip Downer’s chairmanship I’m looking forward to helping WBD’s 10th anniversary year be the most successful yet."

References

British publishers (people)
People educated at Godolphin and Latymer School
1955 births
Living people